YLK may refer to:

YLK Organization, a Hong Kong musical duo
Youth Legacy Kilometer, a sponsorship program that formed much of the 1984 Summer Olympics torch relay
Lake Simcoe Regional Airport (IATA code), in Ontario, Canada